Nickelodeon Streak is a wooden out-and-back roller coaster at Blackpool Pleasure Beach, Blackpool, England. It was built in 1933 by Charles Paige and uses the lift hill and other parts of the former Velvet Coaster, which was removed in 1932. From 1933 to 2010 it was known simply as Roller Coaster however after Nickelodeon Land was announced the coaster was renamed and rethemed to Nickelodeon Streak. Now removed, a train from the Velvet Coaster used to be preserved on show in the station of Roller Coaster. It is currently the second tallest wooden coaster out of the four wooden coasters at Pleasure Beach Blackpool.

Nickelodeon Streak has 3 cars per train, seating 8 people per car; 24 people per train. Before 2006, the trains had no restraints, however the newer trains currently used on the ride, taken from the Big Dipper have lap-bars.

On 27 July 2010, Pleasure Beach Blackpool unveiled plans for the creation of Nickelodeon Land, to open in time for 2011 season. Roller Coaster has been "extensively re-themed" and now operates full-time as the "Nickelodeon Streak". As well as the major re-theme and modernisation, it has been repainted orange to fit the new Nickelodeon Land area, which has 12 rides.

References

Blackpool Pleasure Beach
Roller coasters in the United Kingdom
Roller coasters introduced in 1933